Detmold is an unincorporated community and census-designated place (CDP) in Allegany County, Maryland, United States. As of the 2010 census it had a population of 71.

The town is in the valley of Georges Creek between two high ridges: Big Savage Mountain to the northwest, and Dans Mountain to the southeast.
The town is named for Christian Edward Detmold of Lonaconing Iron Furnace fame. It is south of Lonaconing, along Route 36. It had a population of 71 in 2010.

Demographics

References

Census-designated places in Allegany County, Maryland
Census-designated places in Maryland